Shultz v. Wheaton Glass Co., 421 F.2d 259 (3rd Cir. 1970) was a case heard before the United States Court of Appeals for the Third Circuit in 1970. It is an important case in studying the impact of the Bennett Amendment on Title VII of the Civil Rights Act of 1964, helping to define the limitations of equal pay for men and women. In its rulings, the court determined that a job that is "substantially equal" in terms of what the job entails, although not necessarily in title or job description, is protected by the Equal Pay Act. An employer who hires a woman to do the same job as a man but gives the job a new title in order to offer it a lesser pay is discriminating under that act.

Background
Wheaton Glass employed men as "selector-packer-stackers" but employed women as ""selector-packers". Both performed similar work in the company's warehouse in Millville, New Jersey but the longer title paid substantially higher wages.

See also
Gender equality
List of gender equality lawsuits

References

United States Court of Appeals for the Third Circuit cases
United States labor case law
1970 in United States case law
Millville, New Jersey
United States gender discrimination case law
United States employment discrimination case law
History of women in New Jersey